Alampla palaeodes is a moth in the family Immidae. It was described by Edward Meyrick in 1914. It is found in Taiwan and Guangdong, China.

References

Moths described in 1914
Immidae
Moths of Asia